"She Ain't Got..." is a song recorded by American singer LeToya Luckett released as the second single taken from her second studio album Lady Love (2009). The song was written by LeToya Luckett, Andre Merritt, Chris Brown, Cory Bold and produced by Bold. The song was released on June 1, 2009, through Capital Records.

It is the first single by LeToya to carry a Parental Advisory sticker; however, the clean version of the song has also been released with the title "She Ain't Got..." and does not feature the sticker on the cover.

Music video
The music video was shot on June 3, 2009. It was directed by Bryan Barber. The video features guest star Major League Baseball players Orlando Hudson and Matt Kemp of the Los Angeles Dodgers and Baseball Hall of Fame member Dave Winfield. A clean version music video was released on EMI's YouTube channel on July 13, 2009 under the title "She Ain't Got... (Swing Batta, Batta)". She is seen accidentally finding out through a short text message in her love interest's (played by Sean Newman) cell phone that he is cheating on her. Then, she is shown involved in a heated argument with him at a crowded nightclub where she is tapped to make a performance. The video is particularly notable because it is the first music video by LeToya which features such a prominent dance routine.

Chart performance
In the United States the song charted at number thirty-nine on the Billboard Rhythmic Top 40 chart.

On September 5, 2009, the song debuted at number forty-four on the Hot Dance Club Play charts. In its second week the song risen seven places and peaked at number thirty-seven. In its third week the song risen a further nine places and peaked at number twenty-eight. In its fourth week the song risen four places and peaked at number twenty-four. In its fifth week the song reached its peak at number twenty and remained for two consecutive weeks before falling to number twenty-four in its seventh week. The song spent a total of nine weeks on the Hot Dance Club Play before falling out of the top fifty at number forty-one on October 31, 2009.

Track listing and formats

Charts

Release history

References

2009 singles
LeToya Luckett songs
Music videos directed by Bryan Barber
Songs written by LeToya Luckett
Songs written by Andre Merritt
Songs written by Chris Brown
2009 songs
Capitol Records singles